Michel-Marie Bernard Calvet S.M. (born 3 April 1944 in Autun, France) is the French-born New Caledonian Archbishop.  He has served as the Archbishop of the Roman Catholic Archdiocese of Nouméa from since his appointment on 19 June 1981. He also served as the Titular bishop of the Diocese of Nigrae Maiores.

Calvert was ordained as a Catholic priest in the Society of Mary on 28 April 1973.

On 4 July 1979 Calvert was appointed as an Auxiliary Bishop of the Roman Catholic Archdiocese of Nouméa, based in Nouméa, New Caledonia. He was simultaneously appointed the titular bishop on Nigrae Maiores on the same day.

Michel-Marie Calvet was appointed the Archbishop of the Archdiocese of Nouméa on 19 June 1981. He continued to serve as Archbishop as of 2010.

References

1944 births
New Caledonian people of French descent
New Caledonian Roman Catholic archbishops
French Roman Catholic archbishops
People from Nouméa
Living people
Marist Brothers
Roman Catholic archbishops of Nouméa